Ana Girardot (born 1 August 1988) is a French actress and director. She is known for Escobar: Paradise Lost (2014); her role of Lucy in the television series Les Revenants (The Returned); and Someone, Somewhere (2019).

Life and career
Ana Girardot was born on August 1, 1988, in Paris, Ana Girardot is the daughter of French actor Hippolyte Girardot and actress Isabel Otero, and the granddaughter of painters Antonio Otero and Clotilde Vautier. She chose to become an actress despite her father's disapproval, and later went to New York City for two years to study theatre. After performing secondary roles in television and cinema, Girardot scored a leading role in the film Lights Out, which was presented at the 2010 Cannes Film Festival.

Filmography

Feature films

Short films

Television

Music videos 
 2010 : It's Working by MGMT

Theatre 
 2014 : Romeo and Juliet, Théâtre de la Porte-Saint-Martin

References

External links 

 

1988 births
Living people
Actresses from Paris
French film actresses
French television actresses
French stage actresses
20th-century French actresses
21st-century French actresses